The Ammar Mosque and Osman Ramju Sadick Islamic Centre or Wan Chai Mosque is a mosque and Islamic centre in Wan Chai, Hong Kong. It is the third mosque built in Hong Kong.

History

First building
The original building of this mosque can be traced back to the first Muslim cemetery in Hong Kong located at 7 Seymore Street where there were only five or six burials took place. By that time, the Ammar Mosque was just a small mosque built adjacent to the cemetery which was used primarily to offer funeral prayer. However, once the Muslim population increased, Muslims living nearby the mosque began to use it for daily prayers as well. The earliest grave can be traced back to the year of 1864. The site is now used for Jewish synagogue and the Muslim cemetery was moved to Happy Valley Muslim Cemetery.

Second building
After World War II, the new Ammar Mosque was constructed. In December 1978, the land in which the mosque was built was requisitioned by the British Hong Kong government for the construction of the Aberdeen Tunnel. The government offered them a new plot of land in the current location of Ammar Mosque at the Oi Kwan Road in Wan Chai and paid $2.5 million towards the re-provisioning for the new mosque.

Current building
The construction of the current mosque building started in September 1979 with funds from the Islamic Union of Hong Kong and was formally opened on 14 September 1981. In 2012, the mosque underwent major renovation which the cost of HK$ 14 million which lasted for 6 months. This includes the installation of new central air conditioning system, CCTV, new outer painting colour, replacement of toilet and ablution areas, new study rooms etc.

Architecture
The mosque was designed by a Chinese Muslim, Ramju Sadick. The centre of the mosque is an eight-storey complex with multi-purpose facilities, such as ablution halls for men and women on the first floor, mosque male prayer hall on the second floor, mosque female prayer hall on the third floor and Chinese restaurant, Halal bakery, medical services, classrooms, library, offices for Imam and Quran teachers, conference and seminar rooms on the fourth until eighth floor .

Activities
Ammar mosque houses the headquarters of Incorporated Trustees of the Islamic Community Fund of Hong Kong and Hong Kong Islamic Youth Association. The mosque regularly holds Islamic workshops every weekends. It also holds classes for newly converts to Islam and proper Quran reading. Occasionally, the mosque hosts tour visits by school or university students on organised field trips.

Transport
The building is accessible east from Wan Chai station and also west from Causeway Bay station.

See also
 Islam in Hong Kong
 Incorporated Trustees of the Islamic Community Fund of Hong Kong
 List of mosques in Hong Kong

References

1967 establishments in Hong Kong
Mosques in Hong Kong
Mosques completed in 1981
Mosques completed in 1967
Wan Chai